Kamalabad (also Romanized as Kamālābād; also known as Kamālābād Nūq) is a village in Rezvan Rural District, Ferdows District, Rafsanjan County, Kerman Province, Iran. At the 2006 census, its population was 200, in 46 families.

References 

Populated places in Rafsanjan County